Eulamprotes superbella is a species of moth in the family Gelechiidae. It is widely distributed in Europe, from the Alps to northern Europe. Outside Europe it is found in Turkey, the Caucasus, Siberia (Transbaikalia) and Mongolia. The wingspan is 6–7 mm. Adults are on wing from April to June. The larvae feed on Thymus serpyllum and Gnaphalium species.

References

External links 
 
 

Moths described in 1839
Eulamprotes
Moths of Europe
Insects of Turkey